The BMW 327 is a medium-sized touring coupé produced by the Bavarian firm between 1937 and 1941, and again produced after 1945. It sat on a shortened version of the BMW 326 chassis.

Launch

The first 327, launched in 1937, was a cabriolet. In 1938, this was joined by a fixed head coupé version. The car was shorter and lower than its sedan counterpart, but shared the famous BMW grill and a streamlined form representative of the more progressive designs of the 1930s.

Technical

Mechanically, the car utilised the hydraulic brake control, gear box, clutch and front suspension system first seen on the BMW 326, along with the live axle used on the BMW 320 and BMW 328. The BMW M78 straight-6 engine was used.

A higher-powered model, the 327/28, was offered with the M328 engine. 569 of these high-powered 327/28 cars were built up to 1940.

Commercial
Among some enthusiasts, the 327 has subsequently been overshadowed by its more uncompromising sibling, the  BMW 328 which appeared in April 1936. In its day, however, the 327 was the bigger seller, with 1,396 base engined versions built between 1937 and 1941, and significant further production after 1945.

Afterlife

During the 1930s, Eisenach was the centre of BMW’s automobile manufacturing. In 1945, Eisenach was occupied by United States forces. However, the wartime allies had already agreed that Thuringia would fall within the Soviet occupation zone. BMW's automobile factory in Eisenach was not fully destroyed, and assembly of the 327 resumed. Clear production figures are hard to obtain, but many of the 327s surviving with collectors into the twenty-first century were post-war products. After the war, it became clear that the Soviets would not return the Eisenach factory to BMW. BMW-branded automobiles produced between 1945 and 1952 were therefore being produced outside the control of BMW headquarters in Munich. This caused a protracted dispute concerning title to the BMW brand and other assets, but in 1952 it was determined that Eisenach-produced models such as the 327s should be badged as EMW (Eisenacher Motorenwerk, Eisenach Motors' Works) rather than as BMW (Bayerische Motoren Werke, Bavarian Motors' Works). The BMW's blue and white badge from the Bavarian coat of arms changed to the EMW's red and white badge from the Thuringian coat of arms.

It is not clear how many of the post war 327s were branded as BMWs and how many as EMWs, but 505 were produced with one or other of the badges.

References

327
Coupés
Convertibles
Rear-wheel-drive vehicles
1930s cars
1940s cars
1950s cars
Cars introduced in 1937